Michael Reagan (born 1945) is an American radio host and Republican strategist.

Michael Reagan may also refer to:
Michael D. Reagan, a signatory of the 1964 "The Triple Revolution" open memorandum
Michael Joseph Reagan (born 1954), U.S. federal judge
Mike Reagan, American composer

See also 
 Michael Regan (disambiguation)